The Romantics is the debut album of American rock band The Romantics, released on 4 January 1980 under Nemperor Records giving it the distinction of being the first pop record released in the 1980s. It includes the Billboard Hot 100 hit "What I Like About You", which peaked at #49.

Track listing
All songs written by Palmar/Marinos/Skill (Copyright ForeverEndeavor Music), except where noted.

Charts

Personnel
The Romantics
Wally Palmar - lead vocals and backing vocals, rhythm guitar, harmonica
Mike Skill - lead guitar, backing vocals
Rich Cole - bass, lead vocals on "Till I See You Again", backing vocals
Jimmy Marinos - drums, percussion, lead vocals on "What I Like About You"

Production
Recorded at Coconuts Recording N Miami Beach Fl
Produced by Pete Solley for Spyder Records
Recorded and engineered by Steve Brown
Assistant Engineer Hal Hansford
Mastered by Greg Calbi

References

External links
"The Romantics" at discogs
Album review, with band overview

1980 debut albums
The Romantics albums